The coins of British America were issued in 1688 and in between 1722 and 1724.

1688 coinage
This coin depicts King James II of England on a horse on the obverse, and crowned shields on the reverse.

William Wood's coinage

This issue is also known as the Rosa Americana (Latin for American Rose) coinage. These coins depict a laureated portrait of King George I of Great Britain facing right on the obverse. The Halfpenny and 1 Penny depict a rose right in the centre of the reverse, whereas the Twopence depicts a crowned rose on the reverse.

The 1 Penny also exists with a crowned rose depicted on the reverse dated 1723.

See also

Trader's currency token of the Colony of Connecticut
William Wood (ironmaster)

British Empire
Numismatics
British America